The Guardians of Divinity are a religious far-right, anti-vaccine, and anti-LGBTQ group based in New York City. The organization originally started to protest vaccine and mask mandates during the COVID-19 pandemic before turning their focus to protesting Drag Story Hour (DSH) events alongside the Proud Boys and Gays Against Groomers; they claim the DSH  events are "grooming" children and are sexually explicit. They are known for harassing businesses and individuals and have been behind many of the anti-DSH protests in NYC. David Nieves, who also goes by "King Jesus", is a leading member.

Activities 

The Guardians of Divinity started as an anti-vaccine and anti-mask mandate group during the COVID-19 pandemic. It has promoted QAnon-related child trafficking conspiracy theories and has a history of harassing businesses and individuals. In January 2023, reporter Talia Jane, who has been tracking the group since September 2022, stated the group has targeted at least 10 DSH events in NYC; in 3 they entered the library to harass the attendees and performers, in another 3 they attempted too but were blocked by community defenders. Unicorn Riot reported that the Guardians of Divinity website was hosted in an account managed by Paula Grooms. The website was taken down when they reached out but had already been archived.

On October 18, 2022, they disrupted a community forum hosted by Representative Alexandria Ocasio-Cortez.

On December 7, a group of anti-DSH protestors organized by Guardians of Divinity protested a bilingual DSH event and called for the closure of a Midtown Library. One of the protestors said they were glad to have ended the event early.

On December 17, New York City Council member Erik Bottcher attended a DSH event in Chelsea which was targeted by about 20 anti-LGBT protestors including the group. After the reading was concluded, they chased the drag artist down the block and surrounded their car until dispersed by police. 

On December 19, two protestors associated with Guardians of Divinity and Gays Against Groomers, Erica Sanchez and D'Anna Morgan, were arrested for entering Bottcher's building and refusing to leave before eventually doing so. The protestors also defaced the sidewalk outside of his apartment with graffiti calling him a pedophile and using slurs such as "groomer". The group also entered and vandalized his nearby office building. David Nieves was arrested for assaulting Bottcher's neighbor, a 52-year-old man who had been walking his dog, who he harassed, struck in the face causing him to bleed, and then pushed into a car.

On December 29, a group of approximately 40 people including the Guardians of Divinity, Freedom Rally, over two dozen members of the Five Points chapter of Proud Boys, members of the neo-nazis Goyim Defense League including Jovi Val, and right-wing journalists Elad Eliahu, from Timcast News, Oren Levy, who goes by Leeroy Press and Viral News NYC online, and Pamela Hall attempted to disrupt a Drag Story Hour (DSH) event at the Jackson Heights Library. One neo-nazi was recorded giving a "heil Hitler" salute; both were escorted away by police. They were met by a group of over 300 DSH supporters, including Outlive Them, Jews For Racial and Economic Justice, and United Against Racism and Fascism; the groups were kept apart by approximately 20 police. The community defenders used umbrellas to block press from recording children and adults without their consent, one stated this was due to the group having tried to doxx and harass them and the attendees in the past. A video showing the New York City Police (NYPD) holding the transit fare gates open for several Proud Boys and Nieves went viral and garnered millions of views. When a journalist said "Oh wow, Proud Boys don't have to pay for the fare?". one of them replied "We're special. Thank you. Appreciate it. It's from your taxes." Police stopped the press who were recording the incident from entering the station. The Guardians of Divinity had protested events in Jackson Heights previously.

Before the protest, New York City Council members Shekar Krishnan, Crystal Hudson, and Erik Bottcher, who had each been subject to harassment and intimidation from the Guardians of Divinity, in addition to council speaker Adrienne Adams released a joint statement condemning the "homophobic and transphobic" actions and vandalism targeting DSH events and themselves. They said it was "particularly disturbing" that the harassment was focused in Jackson Heights and Chelsea, which are historically tied to LGBTQIA+ communities and the LGBTQIA+ movement in NYC. In a public letter after the event, the community defenders stated "The atmosphere outside the library was filled with joy, music, love, and community. … Our safety team and medics were there to ensure the safety of the families and performers the entire time. We were in every way the opposite of the hateful groups who had hoped to intimidate us away." They also criticized the NYPD's response, including poor barricade setup which made it difficult for attendees to enter, crushing protestors between cars and barricades and using batons against them, and escorting two Nazis to their car and the Proud Boys to the station.

On January 4 and February 1, 2023, a group of right-wing activists protested DSH events at the 96th street library. The protestors accused the library of "grooming" children, attempted to draw equivalencies between drag performers and trans people with pedophilia, pornography, and drug abuse, and spouted anti-vaccination rhetoric. Talia Jane told Patch she believes that Guardians of Divinity was behind the protests and questioned the NYPD's decision to position the protestors by the library entrance.

On February 24, 6-10 people who Gay City News described as "mostly male, mostly white" protested a DSH event at the Jackson Heights library from across the street. David Nieves and another man with a sign identifying himself as a member of the Guardians were present, in addition to an older man with a "Gays for Trump" flag. Approximately 100 volunteers and DSH supporters came to defend the event in front of the building, one of whom was reportedly arrested.

Alex Stein, a Blaze TV host, has attended the protests and instigated harassment against partipants and counter-protestors. At one event he promoted Nieves.

References

Far-right politics in the United States
Organizations based in New York City
Anti-vaccination organizations
American anti-vaccination activists
Drag events
Anti-LGBT sentiment
Organizations that oppose LGBT rights in the United States